Southwest Airlines Flight 812 was a Boeing 737-300 passenger jet that on April 1, 2011, suffered rapid depressurization while cruising at  near Yuma, Arizona, leading to an emergency landing at Yuma International Airport. Two of the 123 people on board suffered minor injuries. The aircraft was operating Southwest Airlines' domestic scheduled service from Phoenix, Arizona, to Sacramento, California.

The NTSB investigation revealed evidence of pre-existing metal fatigue, and determined the probable cause of the incident to be related to an error in the manufacturing process for joining fuselage crown skin panels.

The incident was the second of this type in less than two years, following the structural failure of Southwest Airlines Flight 2294 in 2009, and led to the FAA increasing the inspection rate of certain airframes.

Incident
Flight 812 was a domestic scheduled passenger flight from Phoenix Sky Harbor International Airport, to Sacramento International Airport. On April 1, 2011, it was carrying five crew and 117 passengers. Takeoff and initial climb-out were normal. As the aircraft approached its cruising altitude, at approximately 15:58 local time (22:57 UTC), while climbing through FL344 to reach FL360, a loud bang was heard, recorded as an unidentified noise on the cockpit voice recorder (CVR). According to eyewitnesses, one of the ceiling panels dislodged.

About two seconds later, the captain announced that cabin pressurization had been lost, and called for oxygen masks on. At this point, sounds of increased wind noise were heard on the CVR. Cabin oxygen masks deployed. The captain declared an emergency to air traffic control, and received clearance to make an emergency descent. At this point the flight attendants began relaying reports to the pilots of an injury and a "two-foot hole" in the fuselage. The aircraft then landed without further incident at 16:23 at the joint Marine Corps Air Station Yuma/Yuma International Airport.

One flight attendant and an off-duty airline employee received minor injuries, but were both treated at the airport. The flight attendant had been attempting to make an interphone call to the pilots or a PA announcement to the passengers, instead of immediately donning his oxygen mask as he had been trained. As a result, he lost consciousness, fell, and struck the forward cabin partition, breaking his nose. An off-duty airline employee rushing to assist the flight attendant also lost consciousness, fell, and received a cut to the head. Both regained consciousness as the aircraft descended. A spare aircraft with maintenance technicians, ground crew, and customer service agents was dispatched from Phoenix to take the passengers to Sacramento. The replacement aircraft was expected to reach Sacramento with a 4-hour delay to the passengers on board Flight 812.

This was the second structural failure, rapid decompression, and emergency landing for Southwest Airlines in two years. Southwest Airlines Flight 2294, also a 737-300, suffered a football-sized hole in its fuselage on July 13, 2009, in a similar incident. That aircraft also made a safe emergency landing.

Aircraft

The aircraft involved was Boeing 737-3H4 with registration N632SW, manufacturer's serial number 27707, line number 2799. It was delivered to Southwest in 1996 and at the time of the accident had completed 48,748 hours and 39,786 cycles.

The aircraft fuselage was manufactured at Boeing's facility at Wichita, Kansas, and was shipped in two pieces (forward and aft sections) by rail from Wichita to Boeing's Renton, Washington, facility for final assembly. The Renton facility then joined the forward and aft fuselage sections, completing a drilling and riveting process that had been intentionally left unfinished at the Wichita facility, for ease of production in Renton. The area of fuselage crown skin that would fail in this incident was at the site of the split manufacturing process, where work was partially performed in Wichita and finished in Renton.

Aftermath

Inspection of the aircraft at Yuma revealed a section of fuselage skin had fractured and flapped open, causing the rapid decompression. Southwest grounded 80 of its Boeing 737-300s for inspection following the incident. The grounded aircraft were those that had not had the skin on their fuselage replaced. Five aircraft were discovered to have cracks. The aircraft were to be repaired and returned to service. As of April 3, 2011, Boeing was developing a Service Bulletin for the inspection of similar aircraft.

On April 5, 2011, the FAA issued an emergency airworthiness directive (AD) requiring operators of 737 series 300, 400 and 500 aircraft to increase the frequency of inspections of lap joints on high flight cycle airframes. The AD requires that aircraft with over 30,000 cycles be inspected within 20 days of receipt of the AD, or upon reaching 30,000 cycles. For aircraft with over 35,000 cycles, the inspection is required within 5 days. The AD also requires periodic inspections of the same joints at every 500 cycles for aircraft with over 30,000 cycles. The AD refers to a range of airframes, line numbers 2553–3132 inclusive, totaling 580 aircraft. Of the total of 580 aircraft, only 175 met the 30,000 cycle requirement at the time of the AD issuance, with 80 of those operating in the United States. The FAA AD is effective to only the portion of those that are registered in the United States, since the FAA can only mandate such changes in the United States. Countries with reciprocity airworthiness agreements will also follow the AD, but other nations are not required to adhere to the ruling. As a result of the incident, the FAA investigated Boeing's manufacturing techniques to discover whether or not they had any bearing on the cause of the failure. The incident aircraft was not considered to have a high number of cycles. Boeing co-operated with the FAA in the investigation.

Air New Zealand inspected all fifteen of their 737-300s and Qantas inspected four of their 21 737-400s. Several of the thirty-seven 737-400s operated by Malaysia Airlines were also to be inspected.

Post-incident interviews showed the injured flight attendant had seriously overestimated his time of useful consciousness, and the NTSB renewed its criticism of the FAA's overly-optimistic time of useful consciousness tables and training requirements.

Investigation
The Federal Aviation Administration sent an inspector to Yuma. The National Transportation Safety Board opened an investigation into the incident. The tear was along a lap joint. In March 2010, cracks had been found and repaired in the same place on the incident aircraft. The cause was determined to have been a manufacturing error dating from when the aircraft was built.

In popular culture 
The events of the incident were documented in a series two episode of Aircrash Confidential titled "Maintenance Failure".

The event was referenced in a Weekend Update segment of Saturday Night Live in episode 19 of season 36. Kristen Wiig played a flight attendant from the flight named Shelly Elaine.

See also
 Aloha Airlines Flight 243
 Southwest Airlines Flight 2294
 Southwest Airlines Flight 1380
 Daallo Airlines Flight 159
 Qantas Flight 30

Notes

References

External links

 "Southwest Airlines Responds to Loss of Pressurization Event on Flight From Phoenix to Sacramento." Southwest Airlines.
 Full list of operators affected by the AD

Airliner accidents and incidents in Arizona
2011 in Arizona
April 2011 events in the United States
Aviation accidents and incidents in the United States in 2011
Accidents and incidents involving the Boeing 737 Classic
812
Airliner accidents and incidents caused by in-flight structural failure